Garden Valley is an unincorporated census-designated place in Boise County, Idaho, United States. As of the 2010 census, its population was 394. The mountain setting and recreation opportunities attract visitors from the Boise area. Life there during the pioneer days was quite harsh and economic opportunity was based on logging, mining, and ranching. In later years there was work as hunting guides.

History
Garden Valley's population was 25 in 1909, and was 10 in 1960.

Geography

Demographics

Notable people
 James Castle, artist, was a native of Garden Valley.
 Paul Revere Dick, known professionally as Paul Revere, founder of rock group Paul Revere & the Raiders.

References

Census-designated places in Boise County, Idaho
Census-designated places in Idaho
Boise metropolitan area